Athletes from Trinidad and Tobago competed at the 1964 Summer Olympics in Tokyo, Japan. This marked the return of Trinidad and Tobago to the Olympic Games as a separate nation, after having competed as part of the British West Indies at the 1960 Summer Olympics. Thirteen competitors, all men, took part in ten events in four sports.

Medalists

Silver
 Wendell Mottley — Athletics, Men's 400 metres

Bronze
 Edwin Roberts — Athletics, Men's 200 metres  
 Edwin Skinner, Kent Bernard, Wendell Mottley, and Edwin Roberts — Athletics, Men's 4x400 metres

Athletics

Cycling

Three cyclists represented Trinidad and Tobago in 1964.

Sprint
 Roger Gibbon
 Fitzroy Hoyte

1000m time trial
 Roger Gibbon

Individual pursuit
 Ronald Cassidy

Sailing

Weightlifting

References

External links
Official Olympic Reports
International Olympic Committee results database

Nations at the 1964 Summer Olympics
1964
1964 in Trinidad and Tobago